This is a list of winners and nominations for the Tony Award for Best Costume Design in a Musical for outstanding costume design of a musical. The award was first presented in 1961 after the category of Best Costume Design was divided into Costume Design in a Play and Costume Design in a Musical with each genre receiving its own award.

Winners and nominees

1960s

2000s

2010s

2020s

Trivia
In 2010, Santo Loquasto received a nomination for Best Costume Design for a Musical for Ragtime.  Loquasto, who was previously nominated for the same show in the same category in 1998, was later disqualified because the designs were predominantly recycled work from the earlier production.  No replacement was made for the nomination.

See also
 Tony Award for Best Costume Design in a Play
 Drama Desk Award for Outstanding Costume Design of a Musical
 Laurence Olivier Award for Best Costume Design

References

External links
Tony Awards Official site
Tony Awards at Internet Broadway database Listing
Tony Awards at broadwayworld.com

Tony Awards
Awards established in 1961
1961 establishments in New York City